Tamás Hajnal (born 15 March 1981) is a Hungarian former professional footballer who played as a midfielder.

Career
Born in Esztergom, Hungary, Hajnal started playing football at the local Zoltek SE in his hometown Nyergesújfalu.

Ferencvárosi TC and Dunakanyar Vác FC
At the age of nine, Hajnal joined Ferencvárosi TC. He played two matches in the Hungarian National Championship I for Ferencvárosi TC. In the same year, he moved to Dunakanyar-Vác FC as part of an exchange deal. He did not play any matches in the Dunakanyar-Vác FC. Next year he headed for the German Bundesliga.

Schalke 04
Dunakanyar-Vác FC made a lot of money by quickly selling him to FC Schalke 04. He found it hard to make the breakthrough with the Royal Blues, and after a mere seven Bundesliga appearances he moved to Belgium in 2004.

Sint-Truiden
He joined Sint-Truidense V.V. in 2004. In the 2004–05 Belgian First Division season he scored six goals in 29 matches. In the next season he played 20 matches and scored five goals.

1.FC Kaiserslautern
In 2006, Hajnal moved to the Bundesliga to join 1. FC Kaiserslautern. He played 32 matches and scored seven goals in the 2006–07 2. Bundesliga season.

Karlsruher SC

In 2007, Hajnal transferred to Karlsruher SC. He played 32 matches and scored eight goals in the 2007–08 Bundesliga season.

Borussia Dortmund
In July 2008, he moved to Borussia Dortmund for a fixed transfer fee of €1.3m.

His performance in Dortmund's 4–0 win against Frankfurt on 15 November 2008—scoring once and assists for three goals—earned him a place in the Bundesliga Team of the Week and made Hajnal Man of The Match. In the next round, Hajnal was again in the Team of the Week. He played 30 matches and scored five  goals during the 2008–09 Bundesliga season. In the 2009–10 Bundesliga season he played 21 matches. He was injured in 2010, therefore he could not play in the 2010–11 Bundesliga season for Borussia Dortmund.

VfB Stuttgart
On 31 January 2011, Hajnal was loaned out to VfB Stuttgart. He scored his first goal against Eintracht Frankfurt on 27 February 2011. The final result was 2–0 for Stuttgart. On 7 May 2011, Hajnal moved permanently to VfB Stuttgart because the club avoided relegation.

Hajnal extended his contract with VfB Stuttgart on 7 January 2013 until June 2014 with an option for a further year.

FC Ingolstadt 04
On 1 August 2013, he moved to FC Ingolstadt 04. He made his debut in the 2. Bundesliga against Karlsruher SC. In September 2014 he announced he would be leaving the club, and likely returning to his native Hungary.

Ferencváros
On 12 December 2014, Hajnal returned to his former club Ferencvárosi TC after 17 years. Current manager of Ferencváros, Thomas Doll had been interested in signing Hajnal previously. However, Hajnal was unaware that Ferencváros intended to sign him a couple of weeks before the offer was made. When Hajnal was a free agent, he was training with Ferencváros. Therefore, it was obvious that he would join the club if he would return to Hungary.

On 7 March 2015, Hajnal scored his first goal in the 57th minute in the 2014–15 season of the Hungarian League against Győr at the Groupama Arena in Budapest.

International career
On 9 October 2004, Hajnal played his first match for Hungary in Solna against Sweden and on 17 October 2007, he scored his first international goal in a friendly match against Poland. The final result was 1–0 to Hungary. Hungary finished a disappointing sixth in their qualifying group for UEFA Euro 2008 and have been out of the running for a place in Austria and Switzerland next year since the beginning of the qualification period. The competition from Greece, Norway and Turkey was simply too strong for Hajnal and his team mates, who nevertheless beat Bosnia-Herzegovina home and away during the campaign.
Hajnal scored twice against Montenegro in the Puskás Ferenc Stadium in a friendly match. The final result was 3–3. During the FIFA World Cup 2010 qualifying he scored against Malta in Budapest. The final result was 3–0. This goal was the first goal scored in a qualifier.
During the management of Sándor Egervári (2010–present), Hajnal played his first match in the Wembley Stadium against England. Hajnal scored a goal against Azerbaijan on 9 February 2011. Hungary defeated Azerbaijan 2–0 in a friendly match.

Career statistics

Club

Honours

Club
Schalke 04
 DFB-Ligapokal runner-up: 2001, 2002

Ferencváros
Nemzeti Bajnokság I: 2015–16
Hungarian Cup: 2014–15, 2015–16, 2016–17
Hungarian League Cup: 2014–15
Szuperkupa: 2015

Individual
 Hungarian Footballer of the Year: 2007, 2008
 Named in the 2007–08 Bundesliga all-star team (bundesliga.de)
 Pro Urbe Prize: 2008

References

External links

 Tamás Hajnal profile at magyarfutball.hu 
 
 

1981 births
Living people
People from Esztergom
Ferencvárosi TC footballers
FC Schalke 04 players
FC Schalke 04 II players
1. FC Kaiserslautern players
Karlsruher SC players
Borussia Dortmund players
Borussia Dortmund II players
VfB Stuttgart players
FC Ingolstadt 04 players
Vác FC players
Sint-Truidense V.V. players
Belgian Pro League players
Bundesliga players
2. Bundesliga players
3. Liga players
Regionalliga players
Nemzeti Bajnokság I players
Hungarian footballers
Hungary international footballers
Hungary under-21 international footballers
Hungarian expatriate footballers
Expatriate footballers in Germany
Expatriate footballers in Belgium
Hungarian expatriate sportspeople in Germany
Hungarian expatriate sportspeople in Belgium
Association football midfielders
Sportspeople from Komárom-Esztergom County